Lütfü Savaş (born 23 March 1965, Yayladağı) is a Turkish politician and doctor, serving as the mayor of Hatay Province of Turkey.

Early life and education
Savaş was born in the Dağdüzü village in the Yayladağı district of the province of Hatay. He is of Turkmen origin and has Syrian Turkmen relatives in Syria. He grew up in Antakya's Havuzlar neighborhood. In 1990, he graduated from the Medical School of Anadolu University in Eskişehir.

Career
He took part in the establishment of Mustafa Kemal University's Medical School. He became an associate professor in 2007. Between 2006 and 2008, he was the advisor of the rector of Mustafa Kemal University.

References 

1965 births
People from Yayladağı
People from Hatay Province
20th-century Turkish politicians
21st-century Turkish politicians
Contemporary Republican People's Party (Turkey) politicians
Living people